Lakhteki (also Romanized as Lakhtekī; also known as Lakhtekeh) is a village in Jirdeh Rural District, in the Central District of Shaft County, Gilan Province, Iran. At the 2006 census, its population was 432, in 112 families.

References 

Populated places in Shaft County